= Omerkhan Daira =

- Census town
- Location in Telangana, India
- Coordinates: 17.3753°N 78.4744°E
- Country: India
- State: Telangana
- District: Rangareddi

Population (2001)
  - Total: 7,258

Languages
  - Official: Telugu
- Time zone: UTC+5:30 (IST)

Omerkhan Daira is a census town in Rangareddi district in the Indian state of Telangana.

== Demographics ==
As of 2001 India census, Omerkhan Daira had a population of 7258. Males constitute 60% of the population and females 40%. Omerkhan Daira has an average literacy rate of 73%, higher than the national average of 59.5%: male literacy is 81%, and female literacy is 60%. In Omerkhan Daira, 16% of the population is under 6 years of age.
